Jennifer Miller is a Canadian actress, best known for her role as the telekinetic Alex in Five Girls. She trained at Armstrong Acting Studios in Toronto and has also starred in many teen TV series including The Best Years and Radio Free Roscoe.

Filmography

Film

Television

References

External links 

Canadian television actresses
Canadian film actresses
Living people
Year of birth missing (living people)